Robert Welbourn (born 11 June 1987) is a British Paralympian swimmer. He was born in Chesterfield.  He began his swimming career at Deeping Swimming Club in Deeping St. James.

At both the 2004 and 2008 Summer Paralympics he won gold medals in the 4x100 metre freestyle relay (34 points) and silver medals in the 400 metre freestyle (S10) events.

In 2013 Welbourn was part of the British team that competed at the IPC Swimming World Championships in Montreal. He took silver in the 400m freestyle, finishing behind America's Ian Jaryd Silverman.

References

External links
 

1987 births
Living people
English male swimmers
Paralympic swimmers of Great Britain
Paralympic gold medalists for Great Britain
Paralympic silver medalists for Great Britain
Paralympic bronze medalists for Great Britain
Paralympic medalists in swimming
Swimmers at the 2004 Summer Paralympics
Swimmers at the 2008 Summer Paralympics
Swimmers at the 2012 Summer Paralympics
Medalists at the 2004 Summer Paralympics
Medalists at the 2008 Summer Paralympics
Medalists at the 2012 Summer Paralympics
Sportspeople from Chesterfield, Derbyshire
World record holders in paralympic swimming
S10-classified Paralympic swimmers
Medalists at the World Para Swimming Championships
Medalists at the World Para Swimming European Championships
British male freestyle swimmers
British male medley swimmers
21st-century British people